The sixth season of Chicago Fire, an American drama television series with executive producer Dick Wolf, and producers Derek Haas and Matt Olmstead, was ordered on May 10, 2017, by NBC. The season premiered on September 28, 2017 with a timeslot change from Tuesday at 10:00 p.m. to Thursday at 10:00 p.m. The season contained twenty-three episodes and concluded on May 10, 2018.

Overview 
The show follows the lives of the firefighters and paramedics working at the Chicago Fire Department at the firehouse of Engine 51, Truck 81, Squad 3, Ambulance 61 and Battalion 25.

Cast and characters

Main cast
 Jesse Spencer as Lieutenant, Later Captain, Matthew Casey, Truck 81
 Taylor Kinney as Lieutenant Kelly Severide, Squad 3
 Monica Raymund as Firefighter/Paramedic Gabriela Dawson, Ambulance 61, Truck 81
 Kara Killmer as Paramedic in Charge Sylvie Brett, Ambulance 61
 David Eigenberg as Firefighter Christopher Herrmann, Truck 81
 Yuri Sardarov as Firefighter Brian "Otis" Zvonecek, Truck 81
 Joe Minoso as Firefighter Joe Cruz, Squad 3
 Christian Stolte as Firefighter Randy "Mouch" McHolland, Truck 81
 Miranda Rae Mayo as Firefighter Stella Kidd, Truck 81
 Eamonn Walker as Chief Wallace Boden, Battalion 25

Recurring
 Randy Flagler as Firefighter Harold Capp, Rescue Squad 3
 Anthony Ferraris as Firefighter Tony Ferraris, Rescue Squad 3
 DuShon Brown as Connie
 Damon Dayoub as Firefighter Jake Cordova, Truck 81
 Sarah Shahi as Renee Royce
 Treat Williams as Captain Benjamin "Benny" Severide
 Kim Delaney as Jennifer Sheridan
 Jeff Lima as Leon Cruz
 Daniel Di Tomasso as Lieutenant Zach Torbett, Hazmat 2
 Melissa Ponzio as Donna Robbins-Boden
 Robyn Coffin as Cindy Herrmann
 Gordon Clapp as Chaplain Orlovsky
 Gary Cole as Chief Carl Grissom
 Eloise Mumford as Hope Jacquinot
 Daniel Zacapa as Ramón Dawson
 Deanna Reed-Foster as Tina Cantrell
 Quinn Cooke as Bria

Crossover characters
 Jason Beghe as Sergeant Henry "Hank" Voight
 Jon Seda as Detective Antonio Dawson
 Jesse Lee Soffer as Detective Jay Halstead
 Tracy Spiridakos as Detective Hailey Upton
 Patrick Flueger as Officer Adam Ruzek
 Marina Squerciati as Officer Kim Burgess
 Amy Morton as Desk Sergeant Trudy Platt
 Nick Gehlfuss as Dr. Will Halstead
 Yaya DaCosta as April Sexton, RN
 Colin Donnell as Dr. Connor Rhodes
 Brian Tee as Dr. Ethan Choi
 Marlyne Barrett as Maggie Lockwood

Episodes

Ratings

 Live +7 ratings were not available, so Live +3 ratings have been used instead.

Home media
The DVD release of season six was released in Region 1 on August 28, 2018.

References

External links
 
 

2017 American television seasons
2018 American television seasons
Chicago Fire (TV series) seasons